Diospyros lunduensis is a tree in the family Ebenaceae. The tree is named for Lundu in Malaysia's Sarawak state. D. lunduensis is endemic to Borneo.

References

lunduensis
Endemic flora of Borneo
Trees of Borneo
Plants described in 2001